J. Rodman Williams (1918–2008), regarded as the father of modern renewal theology, was a charismatic theologian and professor of renewal theology at Regent University in Virginia Beach, Virginia.

Born on August 21, 1918, in Clyde, North Carolina, Williams earned an AB (1939) from Davidson College, a BD (1943) and ThM (1944) from Union Theological Seminary in Virginia, and a PhD in philosophy of religion and ethics at Union Theological Seminary in New York, taking time in between to serve as a chaplain in the United States Marine Corps (1944-1946).  He was ordained in the Presbyterian Church in the United States in 1943 and served as a pastor for several years before becoming a full-time educator. From 1959-1972, he served as professor of systematic theology at Austin Presbyterian Theological Seminary.  As a key figure in the burgeoning charismatic movement of the 1960s, he was president of the International Presbyterian Charismatic Communion, and later a participant in the International Roman Catholic–Pentecostal Dialogue. In 1972, he became the founding president of the Melodyland School of Theology in Anaheim, California, and in 1985 he served as president of the Society for Pentecostal Studies. He joined the faculty of Regent University in the mid-1980s and holds the title of Emeritus Professor of Renewal Theology.

Important works include the three-volume systematic theology entitled Renewal Theology (1988–92, published as a single volume in 1996), the first complete systematic theology written from a charismatic perspective. It included chapters on the supernatural gifts of the Spirit and a chapter on the Baptism of the Holy Spirit, arguing for the traditional Pentecostal interpretation. He argues also for the Arminian view of the possibility of apostasy.

Published books

 Contemporary Existentialism and Christian Faith (Englewood Cliffs, NJ: Prentice-Hall, 1965).
 The Era of the Spirit (Plainfield, NJ: Logos, 1971). 
 The Pentecostal Reality (Plainfield, NJ: Logos, 1972). 
 Ten Teachings (Carol Stream, IL: Creation House, 1974).
 The Gift of the Holy Spirit Today (Plainfield, NJ: Logos, 1980).
 Renewal Theology [three volumes in one] (Grand Rapids: Zondervan, 1996)
 God, the World, and Redemption (Grand Rapids: Zondervan, 1988). Renewal Theology
 Salvation, the Holy Spirit, and Christian Living (Grand Rapids: Zondervan, 1990). Renewal Theology
 The Church, The Kingdom, and Last Things (Grand Rapids: Zondervan, 1992).

References

Citations

Sources

External links
 Burgess, Stanley M. & Eduard M. van der Maas (editors), The New International Dictionary of Pentecostal and Charismatic Movements, (Revised edition, Zondervan: 2003)
 Williams, J. Rodman, Renewal Theology: Systematic Theology from a Charismatic Perspective, (Zondervan: 1996)

1918 births
2008 deaths
American Charismatics
Arminian ministers
Arminian theologians
People from Clyde, North Carolina
Presbyterian Church in the United States members
Presbyterian Church in the United States ministers
Regent University faculty
Systematic theologians